Jacob Aarup-Andersen (born 6 December 1977) is a Danish businessman and CEO of ISS A/S, a global facilities management company based in Denmark.

Early life
Aarup-Andersen was born on 6 December 1977. He earned a master's degree in economics from the University of Copenhagen in 2002.

Career
From 2002 to 2012, he worked in London for Goldman Sachs, Highbridge Capital and Montrica Investment Management. This was followed by the position as chief portfolio manager at Danske Capital from 2012 to 2014. Aarup-Andersen then became CFO of Danica Pension, a life and pension company, before joining the executive board of Danske Bank as group CFO in 2016. At Danske Bank, in 2018 he moved to the position as head of wealth management and later head of banking.

On 17 October 2018, the Danish financial regulator rejected Aarup-Andersen as the next chief executive (CEO) of Danske Bank (to succeed Thomas Borgen who resigned following a major money laundering scandal), despite him being the board's unanimous choice, citing his lack of experience. On 2020 was announced that Danish services provider ISS hired him as chief executive to replace Jeff Gravenhorst.

Personal life
He is married to Stine.

References

1977 births
University of Copenhagen alumni
Danish bankers
Danske Bank people
Goldman Sachs people
Living people